M. A. Mansoor (1881–1968) was an antiquarian who compiled an exquisite collection of Amarna Period sculptures.

Early life and studies
He was born to Coptic Orthodox Egyptian parents in Cairo in 1881. After having graduated from high school, with an excellent knowledge of Arabic, English and French, he taught Arabic for some years to foreign officials who occupied principal positions in the Egyptian Government.

As early as his sixteenth year, the history of Ancient Egypt - the discipline of Egyptology itself - began to fascinate him. He bought books, became an ardent visitor to the Cairo Museum and traveled extensively in Egypt to admire and study the monuments of his ancestors. He learned much about Egyptian art, but was to learn much more later during his long career as an antiquarian. He studied Coptic and began to decipher hieroglyphics. Soon he also became deeply involved in the study of the art of Mesopotamia, Greece, Persia and the early Christian and Islamic worlds. He loved the antiquity of the Near and Middle East. He understood and appreciated their cultures and their many forms of art. But his first love and prime interest always remained Egypt. In this he excelled and in later years, he developed a distinguished reputation, which left no doubt as to his integrity and his masterful knowledge of every facet of Ancient Egyptian art and culture.
http://www.mansooramarnacollection.com/album/MA_Mansoor.JPG

Career
In October 1904, he approached the Swiss manager of Shepheard's Hotel in Cairo, who was one of his students of Arabic. He asked to rent two showcases in the hotel lobby to display and sell to collectors the small collection of ancient Egyptian sculptures, bronzes, amulets, faience figurines and jewelry that he had acquired during the last few years. The manager was surprised at this request, but after some hesitation he allowed him the showcases on a trial basis for a few months. A year and a half later, the two showcases became a small shop in the main hall of the famous hotel. At that time, Mansoor's business was established. In later years, he opened two more shops in the Semiramis and Continental Hotels and a large gallery across the street from the Cairo Museum.

The purchase and sale of Egyptian and other antiquities was at the time legal, though the Egyptian Department of Antiquities retained the right to inspect all shops and galleries that bought and sold these artifacts. If an important object was found, of which there was no known example in the Cairo Museum, the Department of Antiquities exercised its right to purchase it at a reasonable price. This, however, seldom happened as the Department rarely had the funds to acquire major antiquities.

During his many years in the antique business, M. A. Mansoor met and befriended several of the Egyptologists, antiquarians and collectors of the time. The list of names would be too long to enumerate here, but some should be mentioned: James Quibell, Ernesto Schiaparelli, Wilhelm Spiegelberg, Sir Gaston Maspero, Georg Steindorff, Percy Newberry, Wallis Budge, Pierre Lacau, Arthur Weigall, Charles Boreux, Howard Carter, Lord Carnarvon, Étienne Drioton, Sami Gabra, Alexandre Varille, Christiane Desroches Noblecourt, Ambrose Lansing, William Stevenson Smith, the Khawam brothers, Dikran Kelekian, William Randolph Hearst, King Alfonso XIII of Spain, King Ferdinand I of Bulgaria, King Prajadhipok of Siam, King Carol I of Romania, King Fuad and his son King Farouk of Egypt, Levi de Benzion, Achilles Groppi, and Nigel S. Warren. To most of these kings, scholars and gentlemen, M.A. Mansoor sold many important ancient works of art for their collections or museums. Hundreds of these masterpieces of Egyptian art are today in the world's leading museums: the Egyptian Museum in Cairo, the Louvre, the Vatican Museum, the Metropolitan Museum of Art, the Detroit Museum and the Chicago Oriental Institute, etc., and in many private collections.

In the early 1920s M.A. Mansoor started a collection of rare Amarna artifacts that stand today to be the Amarna World Largest Private Collection. Inside a Los Angeles bank vault reside 33 pieces from one of the most controversial collections of ancient Egyptian art in history. Virtually unknown to all but a handful of Egyptologists and archaeologists, this collection of antiquities from the Amarna period owned by the Mansoor family has been at the heart of unprecedented dispute between scientists and art historians for over fifty years.

Each side's opinion is diametrically opposed to the other. The ones say the Mansoor collection is authentic because the patina and the crust on the statues are genuine? The others say it's not because the stone is not right or man made stone? Who is right? The original players are now either aging or dead. Nevertheless, the controversy lives on. Although two experts only condemned it as a fake - out of the 28 who valued the collection since the end of the 1940s, the moral authority of these two made numerous followers over the years to the extent that today quite many Egyptologists, art historians or museums are convinced - most of the time without having seen the pieces at all - that the collection is a forgery.

Egyptologists in favor of the Mansoor Amarna Collection: On Record

Christiane Desroches Noblecourt Ph.D. 08/17/1981
Inspecteur General des Musees, Chef du
Département des Antiquites Egyptiennes
du Musée du Louvre

Étienne Drioton Ph.D. 01/03/1959
Director General of The Antiquities Department,
Egypt. Then Director, Centre National de la
Recherche Scientifique, Sorbonne. Member of the
Arts Council of French Museums. Conservator in
Chief of the Louvre Museum and Professor at the
Collège de France. ( 6 )

Sami Gabra, Ph.D. 02/23/1959
Former Professor of Ancient History of the
University of Cairo; Former Director of Excavations
of the University of Cairo at Touna; Former
Director of the Institute of Egyptology of the
University of Cairo and Director of Higher Studies
of the Coptic Institute.

Andreina L. Becker-Colonna, Ph.D. 1975
Professor Emeritus, Curator Emeritus of the
Sutro-Egyptian Collection, [San Francisco State
University], California

'Egyptologists Against the Collection': On Record

Prof. Dr. Hans Wolfgang Muller 02/15/1960
Professor of Egyptology, Munich

Egyptologists Against the Collection "Not on Record but via Proxy"

Prof Dietrich Wildung Egyptian Museum of Berlin

Prof Jean Claude Grenier [Universite Paul Valéry Montpellier 3] France

Methods
Mansoor carefully studied every object he possessed, and, when in doubt, never hesitated to consult the many experts and connoisseurs he knew. Every object was dated to the best of his knowledge.

Until the late 1930s, only a few scientific tests to study ancient works of art had been developed. The experts and antiquarians had to rely on their own knowledge of the styles of the many periods of Egyptian art. The microscope, and even the simple magnifying glass, often showed the careful observer the patination, erosion, or dendritic formations (the passing of time action, and the effect of burial in wet soil or sand on the surface of the object under study).

Ethic
M.A. Mansoor strongly believed that every work of ancient art had a soul of its own. "It will speak to you", he used to say. "It has a feeling of its own, and it will tell you if it was made by an artist who lived, thought and was part of a bygone society." His intuition, guided by his knowledge, was phenomenal. He had that innate talent to recognize the ancient Egyptian works of art.

After Howard Carter discovered Tutankhamon's tomb in 1922, tourists and art lovers from all over the world began to visit Egypt in ever increasing numbers. Mansoor's business flourished; there was a constant demand for antiquities. The stories he told of these years were fabulous. These were the years when he made the acquaintance of eminent persons in the field of Egyptology who were to become his teachers, advisers, friends and customers. But above all, he was serving the better interest of Egyptology.

External links
The M. A. Mansoor Amarna Collection -  Virtual museum gallery of Amarna artifacts from the Louvre, the Denver Art Museum and San Francisco State University

1881 births
1968 deaths
Academic staff of the University of Paris
Egyptian antiquarians
20th-century antiquarians